The Australasian Performing Right Association Awards of 2009 (generally known as APRA Awards) are a series of awards which include the APRA Music Awards, Classical Music Awards, and Screen Music Awards. The APRA Music Awards ceremony occurred on 23 June at the Peninsula in Melbourne, they were presented by APRA and the Australasian Mechanical Copyright Owners Society (AMCOS). The Classical Music Awards were distributed on 21 September at the Playhouse Theatre of the Sydney Opera House and are sponsored by APRA and the Australian Music Centre (AMC). The Screen Music Awards were issued on 2 November by APRA and Australian Guild of Screen Composers (AGSC) at the City Recital Hall, Sydney.

Awards
Nominees and winners with results indicated on the right.

See also
Music of Australia

References

External links
APRA official website
APRA Awards – History

2009 in Australian music
2009 music awards
APRA Awards